Operation Exodus is a plan created and publicized by the Sheriff's Department of Bossier Parish, Louisiana. The name is a deliberate reference to the Book of Exodus.

Overview
The goal of the plan is to provide for the parish's self-sufficiency in the event of a crisis, such as a natural disaster or terrorist attack. The sheriff's department plans to train volunteers to defend local resources, such as fuel, from looting that might occur after a disaster. The existence of the ongoing program is anticipated to cost $4500 to pay for training and uniforms, as the weapons expected to be used are already owned by the Sheriff's Department.

Media reaction
Rachel Maddow discussed Operation Exodus with guest Frank Schaeffer on her MSNBC show. Schaeffer claimed the name of the program was a "backhanded comment about the [legitimacy of the] United States government,[and] Barack Obama," as the Israelites fled an unjust leader in the Book of Exodus. The department's own press release states that the name is a reference to "the Israelites...learning to be self-sufficient and handle everything alone, just as the plan provides."

Citing the department's possession of a .50-caliber machine gun, Reason managing editor Jesse Walker described the program as "the intersection of two ugly trends: the militarization of disaster response and the militarization of police work."

References

Disaster preparedness in the United States
Bossier Parish, Louisiana